Mucilaginibacter auburnensis is a Gram-negative, rod-shaped and non-spore-forming bacterium from the genus of Mucilaginibacter which has been isolated from the stem from a corn plant Zea mays from the field of E. V. Smith Research Center, Plant Breeding Unit facility in Tallassee in the United States.

References

External links
Type strain of Mucilaginibacter auburnensis at BacDive -  the Bacterial Diversity Metadatabase	

Sphingobacteriia
Bacteria described in 2014